Beni Biological Station Biosphere Reserve (Reserva de Biosfera Estación Biológica del Beni)) is a protected area in Bolivia located in the Beni Department, in the José Ballivián Province and Yacuma Province.

References

External links 
 www.fundesnap.org / Beni Biological Station Biosphere Reserve (Spanish)
 A ground photograph of a building at the Station

Protected areas of Bolivia
Geography of Beni Department
Protected areas established in 1982
Biosphere reserves of Bolivia
Biological stations
1982 establishments in Bolivia